Standard Time, Vol. 3: The Resolution of Romance is an album by Wynton Marsalis, released in 1990. The album reached peak positions of number 101 on the Billboard 200 and number 1 on the Billboard Top Jazz Albums chart.

Reception

In a review for AllMusic, Scott Yanow wrote: "Wynton, perhaps because of his father's presence, is very respectful of the melodies, sometimes overly so. The result is that this set is not as adventurous as one would like although Marsalis's beautiful tone makes the music worth hearing."

The authors of The Penguin Guide to Jazz Recordings noted that the album "consistently surprises," and stated: "Marsalis... is in reflective mood throughout, relying on soft, almost sotto voce harmony effects and a wonderfully lachrymose wah-wah on 'The Seductress'."

Jack Fuller of the Chicago Tribune called the album "a fine example of the trumpeter`s growth," and remarked: "His style is spare and lyrical... The solos, too, emphasize melodic quality and expressiveness over flash."

Writing for Burning Ambulance, Phil Freeman commented: "The album's cover depicts Wynton Marsalis gazing admiringly at his father as the older man plays piano, and that's the dominant mood here... Ellis Marsalis has a somewhat regal piano style, placing his notes with great care and never cutting loose. This in turn keeps his son somewhat restrained, and the rhythm section follows their lead."

Track listing

Personnel
 Wynton Marsalis – trumpet, vocals
 Ellis Marsalis Jr. – piano
 Reginald Veal – bass
 Herlin Riley – drums
Technical
 George Butler – executive producer
 Delfeayo Marsalis – producer
 Stanley Crouch – liner notes

References

1990 albums
Wynton Marsalis albums
Albums produced by George Butler (record producer)
Columbia Records albums